Known as "The Lumber Line," the Bainbridge Northern Railway was operated by the Flint River Lumber Company and originally began operations from Bainbridge, Georgia, to Eldorendo between 1896 and 1899. It was then extended to Paulina. While principally a logging railroad, it also operated passenger service until 1908. The railroad quit operating about 1925.

Stations

References

External links

 Georgia Railroad History page about the Bainbridge Northern Railway

Logging railroads in the United States
Defunct Georgia (U.S. state) railroads